Mezzani is a pasta of short curved tube shape.

References

Types of pasta